Saddle Lake 125 is an Indian reserve of the Saddle Lake Cree Nation in Alberta, located between Smoky Lake County and the County of St. Paul No. 19. It is 24 kilometres west of St. Paul.

Uniquely in Alberta, the Saddle Lake Cree Nation did not give permission for Statistics Canada to enter Saddle Lake 125 during the 2016 Canadian Census, and the reserve went unenumerated.

References

Indian reserves in Alberta